Denden Stadium is a multi-use stadium in Asmara, Eritrea. The facility was built in 1958 by the Asmara municipality. It is currently used mostly for football matches. The initial capacity of the stadium was 5,000 seats.

References
Denden Stadium

Sports venues completed in 1958
Athletics (track and field) venues in Eritrea
Football venues in Eritrea
Buildings and structures in Asmara
Multi-purpose stadiums
Modernist architecture in Eritrea